Cynthia Arrieu-King is an American poet with Chinese heritage.

Early life 
Cynthia Arrieu-King was raised in Louisville, KY.

Career 

Cynthia Arrieu-King is the author of three collections of poetry, People are Tiny in Paintings of China (2010); Manifest (2013); and Futureless Languages (2018). She also co-wrote a chapbook with Ariana-Sophia Kartsonis By a Year Lousy with Meteors (2012) and a book-length collaborative volume of poetry with the late Hillary Gravendyk, Unlikely Conditions (2016).

Arrieu-King edited the anthology-length Asian Anglophone issue of dusie. 

Cynthia Arrieu-King works as an associate professor of creative writing at Stockton University.

Awards and honors 
Manifest won the 2013 Gatewood Prize selected by Harryette Mullen.

Works 
Poetry

 2006 The Small Anything City (Dream Horse Press) (chapbook) ISBN not available
 2010 People are Tiny in Paintings of China (Octopus Books) 
 2013 Manifest (Switchback Books) 
 2018 Futureless Languages (Radiator Press) 
2021 Continuity (Octopus Books) ISBN 978-1733455114

Collaborations

 2016 By Some Miracle a Year Lousy with Meteors with Ariana-Sophia Kartsonis (Dream Horse Press) 
 2017 Unlikely Conditions with Hillary Gravendyk (1913 Press) 

Poems

 "Everybody Believes They are the Good Guy," in Poetry Magazine
 "Something Beyond Interpretation, Lobster, and empire," in Bomb Magazine
 "Saga," American Poetry Review
Creative non-fiction

 The Betweens (Noemi Press) ISBN 978-1934819951

Short fiction

 "Boxes," in The Collagist
 "Franny," in Joyland Magazine
 "Roads Impassable," in StorySouth

References

External links 
 Everybody Believes They Are the Good Guy by Cynthia Arrieu-King
 Cynthia Arrieu-King
 Three Poems by Cynthia Arrieu-King - BOMB Magazine
 Boxes - The Collagist - The Collagist
 Franny
 

Created via preloaddraft
Year of birth missing (living people)
Living people
American women poets
Writers from Louisville, Kentucky
Poets from Kentucky
American women writers of Chinese descent
21st-century American poets
21st-century American women writers
University of Cincinnati alumni
Stockton University faculty